Ledøje-Smørum Fodbold (LSF) is an association football club based in the town of Smørumnedre, Denmark, that competes in the Denmark Series, the fourth tier of the Danish football league system. Founded in 1911, the club play at their home ground Smørum Park. Their colours are white and black. Ledøje-Smørum is affiliated to the local football association, DBU Zealand. The football department is part of the larger sports club, Ledøje-Smørum Idrætsforening, but operates as its own independent unit with their own board of representatives.

History 
In June 1911, Smørum Boldklub was established. Around 1915, the club is able to assemble a strong team, which participates in tournaments under Sjællands Boldspil-Union (SBU), the local branch of the Danish Football Union (DBU). The pitch conditions were primitive during this period, and the players often had to compete on uneven pieces of land or local fields. In the 1920s, Stangkær's lands by Flodvej were often used as a temporary home ground, before a transition was made to a pitch south of Skebjergvej, east of Ormegården. Throughout the 1920s, organised football was played, but official information about the chairmen and board of the club is lacking.

In the early 1930s, the club managed to continue competing with a team, but after 1933, organised football in Smørum Boldklub reached a halt. A contributing factor for this was a better organisation in the neighboring club Måløv Boldklub, which was established in 1935. However, football in the town of Smørum continued during summer competitions on pitches at Gersagergård and at Øbakkegård in Ledøje. Only after the Danish occupation ended in 1945, did Smørum Boldklub revive. Its new leader, the energetic Aage Olsen, took the initiative to assemble teams for the local youth. In 1950, this initiative had resulted in the club having three teams. A boys team, a junior team and a senior team. The pitch issues, however, continued, and during this era the teams played in Smørumovre, but the field was too narrow and crooked and could not be approved for competitive use. Therefore, the home ground was moved to farmer Albrechtsen's field in Lille Smørum, in an area south of Skebjergvej – still under primitive conditions, without changing facilities or showers.

In the early 1950s, a municipal football pitch was built near the planned Central School, which later became Søagerskolen. Still, there were no changing rooms. These were not installed until 1959, where the school was built. Organisationally, this period marked a time of upheaval for Smørum Boldklub. In 1953, in a protest against lack of organisation, a competing club, Ledøje Smørum Idrætsforening, was established, with Jes Dahl Christensen as chairman. In Smørum Boldklub, the youth department was strengthened with Preben Rasmussen and Ejner Jørgensen as initiators. In the following years, the two clubs competed for the players in the region, until 1955 when they decided to merge under the new name Ledøje-Smørum Boldklub.

References

External links
 Official site

Football clubs in Denmark
Egedal Municipality
Association football clubs established in 1911
1911 establishments in Denmark